The Journal of Colloid and Interface Science  is a peer-reviewed scientific journal published by Elsevier. It covers research related to colloid and interface science with a particular focus on colloidal materials and nanomaterials; surfactants and soft matter; adsorption, catalysis and electrochemistry; interfacial processes, capillarity and wetting; biomaterials and nanomedicine; and novel phenomena and techniques. The editor-in-chief is Martin Malmsten (Uppsala University). The journal was established in 1946 as Journal of Colloid Science. It obtained its current name in 1966.

Abstracting and indexing 
The journal is abstracted and indexed in:

According to the Journal Citation Reports, the journal has a 2021 Impact Factor of 9.965, ranking it 32nd out of 162 journals in the category "Chemistry, Physical".

See also
 Colloids and Surfaces A: Physicochemical and Engineering Aspects
 Colloids and Surfaces B: Biointerfaces
 Advances in Colloid and Interface Science
 Current Opinion in Colloid & Interface Science
 Progress in Polymer Science

References

External links 
 

Chemistry journals
Materials science journals
English-language journals
Elsevier academic journals
Biweekly journals
Publications established in 1946